Nucleoporin 85 (Nup85) is a protein that in humans is encoded by the NUP85 gene.

Function 

Bidirectional transport of macromolecules between the cytoplasm and nucleus occurs through nuclear pore complexes (NPCs) embedded in the nuclear envelope. NPCs are composed of subcomplexes, and NUP85 is part of one such subcomplex, Nup107-160.

Model organisms 

Model organisms have been used in the study of NUP85 function. A conditional knockout mouse line called Nup85tm1a(KOMP)Wtsi was generated at the Wellcome Trust Sanger Institute. Male and female animals underwent a standardized phenotypic screen to determine the effects of deletion. Additional screens performed:  - In-depth immunological phenotyping

References

Further reading 

 
 
 
 
 
 
 
 
 

Nuclear pore complex